Carlos Hugo Tordoya Pizarro (born 31 July 1987 in Santa Cruz de la Sierra) is a Bolivian football defender who plays for Real Potosí in the Liga de Fútbol Profesional Boliviano.

Career
Tordoya began his football career at a young age attending the prestigious Tahuichi Academy. In 2006, he was loaned to Argentine club Arsenal de Sarandí where he played in the reserve team. After one year in Argentina, he returned to his home country and signed with popular club Bolívar. Playing for Bolívar Tordoya won the 2009 Apertura tournament, and then he was transferred on loan to Chilean club Cobreloa. He made his debut in the Primera División de Chile on July 19, 2009 in a 2-1 victory over Ñublense. After only making 7 appearances for the zorros, he returned to Bolivia signing for Aurora in 2010. The following season, he joined Guabirá.

Club titles

References

External links
 
 

1987 births
Living people
Sportspeople from Santa Cruz de la Sierra
Bolivian footballers
Bolivian expatriate footballers
Arsenal de Sarandí footballers
C.D. Jorge Wilstermann players
Nacional Potosí players
Club San José players
Club Blooming players
Club Bolívar players
Club Aurora players
Club Real Potosí players
Guabirá players
Cobreloa footballers
Chilean Primera División players
Argentine Primera División players
Expatriate footballers in Chile
Expatriate footballers in Argentina
Association football defenders